Alexander Leonidovich Gintsburg (born 10 November 1951) is a Soviet and Russian microbiologist. Since 1997, he has been the director of the Gamaleya Research Institute of Epidemiology and Microbiology. He is Jewish.

References 

1951 births
Living people
Russian microbiologists
Directors of the Gamaleya Research Institute of Epidemiology and Microbiology
Soviet Jews
Russian Jews